Mario Salvador Camposeco López (6 August 1921 – 17 June 1951) was a Guatemalan footballer.

Born in Quetzaltenango, he started his football career in 1938 playing for the local team América. He then joined club Xelajú becoming its captain and helping the team become champion of the Quetzaltenango department for 10 consecutive seasons (1940–1950). In 1942 he was called as a reinforcement for CSD Municipal by coach Manuel Felipe Carrera to play against Atlante F.C. of Mexico, and in 1943 he was first capped with the Guatemala national team. On 10 March 1946, during the III Central American Football Championship, he scored against Costa Rica in a 4–1 win in San José. In 1948 he was part of a Municipal squad that won a friendly tournament in commemoration of the Cuban Independence in Havana, Cuba. He later participated in the VI Central American and Caribbean Games in 1950. At the time he became the second best scorer ever for Guatemala behind his national teammate Carlos Toledo, with 23 goals, what remains the 4th highest total of all time.

In June 1951, after a friendly match in Quetzaltenango, he was invited by a friend to go aboard an aircraft and fly over the city; there was a mechanic failure and the plane crashed, killing both the pilot and Camposeco. Following the death of the footballer, Quetzaltenango club Xelajú changed its name to "Xelajú M.C." in his honor. The team's stadium was also renamed to Estadio Mario Camposeco after him.

References

External links
 

1921 births
People from Quetzaltenango
Xelajú MC players
Guatemalan footballers
Guatemala international footballers
Victims of aviation accidents or incidents in Guatemala
1951 deaths
Association football forwards
C.S.D. Municipal players